Until Now is an independent album released by the pop-rock band Ingram Hill in 2002.

Track listing
"Will I Ever Make It Home"  
"Almost Perfect"  
"Brother's Keeper"  
"The Day Your Luck Runs Out"
"The Timing"
"Chicago"
"Maybe It's Me"
"Your Smiling Face"

Personnel
Justin Moore - Lead vocals, Rhythm guitar 
Matt Chambless - Drums
Shea Sowell - Bass, backing vocals
Phil Bogard - Lead Guitar

References

2002 debut albums
Ingram Hill albums